is a 1967 Japanese yakuza film directed by Yasuharu Hasebe.

Plot
Yakuza hitman Ryuichi Kuroda (Joe Shishido) is forced into executing his lover on the orders of Boss Azakawa (Takashi Kanda). His brother, aspiring boxer Saburo Kuroda (Jirō Okazaki) in a failed attempt to confront Azakawa, ends up having his fists broken and potential boxing career destroyed. Ryuichi decides to break away from Azakawa, and has his bar raided in retaliation. Ryuichi decides to takes over some of Azakawa's smaller businesses by force.

Azakawa decides to strike back by killing a pachinko arcade operator who willingly went over to the Kurodas and sending his body in a coffin, which also contains a bomb that Ryuichi defuses. Following this, Azakawa blackmails a bowling alley operator now answering to the Kurodas into luring Ryuichi and the middle brother, Eiji (Tatsuya Fuji) into an ambush which they promptly escape from. After Kuroda spares the operator's life, Azakawa switches tactics and kidnaps Saburo. Ryuichi attempts to negotiate for his release by visiting Azakawa's manor, but he has Eiji sneak in and kill the guards just before the handover. However, just before the escape, Eiji kills Azakawa for good measure.

Later, when Eiji attempts to sleep with Azakawa's mistress, he is caught and killed by Azakawa's gunmen now under control of Azakawa's successor Ryuichi's old mentor, Shirasaka (Hideaki Nitani). Ryuichi then decides to face down Shirasaka and challenges him to a final showdown at an under-construction highway. During the attack, Ryuichi whittles down Shirasaki's accompanying gunman before facing Shirasaki man-to-man. Both men end up killing each other in the resulting firefight, as the film ends on Saburo running towards the site of the duel.

Cast
 Joe Shishido as Ryūichi Kuroda
 Tatsuya Fuji as Eiji Kuroda
 Jirō Okazaki as Saburo Kuroda
 Hideaki Nitani as Shirasaka
 Tamaki Sawa as Shino
 Yoko Yamamoto as Aiko
 Takashi Kanda as Akazawa
 Ken Sanders as Chico
 Jūkei Fujioka as Kanayama
 Ryoji Hayama as Midorikawa

Production
Massacre Gun was written by veteran studio screenwriter Ryūzō Nakanishi and credited to him and Takashii Fujii. Fujii was a pseudonym for director Yasuharu Hasebe.

Release
Massacre Gun was released theatrically in Japan on September 6, 1967. The film has receive retrospective release at film festivals, such as the 2012 Fantasia Film Festival where the film received its North American premiere.

Massacre Gun was released on DVD and blu-ray by Arrow Video on April 6, 2015.

Reception
PopMatters gave Massacre Gun a five out of ten rating, noting that the film's story was "as formulaic as possible" and that the film was " all very stylish, and that’s what director Yasuharu Hasebe offers to make the predictable story at least worth looking at." In Video Librarian, a review noted that the film contains "stylish set pieces that don't make much sense but look great" and that Massacre Gun "is a film where style is the substance, an entertaining Japanese gangster noir that will likely be appreciated by fans of Quentin Tarantino."

See also
 Takeo Kimura filmography

References

External links
 
 

Films directed by Yasuharu Hasebe
Yakuza films
Nikkatsu films
1967 films
1960s Japanese films